Araf can refer to:
 Araf,  the Muslim sheol or borderland between heaven and hell for those who are, from incapacity, neither morally bad nor morally good
 ARAF, a gene
 "Araf", a Welsh word meaning "slow"
 Autorité de Régulation des Activités Ferroviaires, a regulatory body in France
 Araf (film)
 The All-Russia Athletic Federation